Mapleton is a rural town and locality in the Sunshine Coast Region, Queensland, Australia.

It includes one of Queensland's largest Outdoor Education Centres (QCCC Mapleton), the Lilyponds, the Mapleton Tavern and historic Seaview House (St Isidore's Farm College), and has panoramic views of the Sunshine Coast.

Geography

The town is located high on the Blackall Range in the Sunshine Coast hinterland, 10 minutes drive from Nambour, 25 minutes from Maleny and 30 minutes from Maroochydore.

Montville–Mapleton Road enters from the south, Nambour–Mapleton Road enters from the east, and Obi Obi Road exits to the south-west.

History
For countless generations, the Blackall Range has held spiritual significance for many Aboriginal people throughout South East Queensland. Abundant bunya pines growing throughout this area produced large nut crops, providing enough food for huge gatherings. When the nut crop peaked every three years, Kabi Kabi and neighbouring Wakka Wakka people hosted the Bonyee Festival. Many invited guests travelled great distances from coastal and inland areas to share food, songs and dances, arrange marriages, and other social interactions. A large grassy area near Baroon Pocket was an important gathering place.

Early settlers of the area grew fruit, vegetables and cereal crops. The first timber cutters extracted red cedar and beech timber taking it to Nambour.

Initially the settlement was known as Luton Vale until 1899 when the name was changed after the English town. The name of Mapleton was decided at a meeting of early settlers in 1894, with one of the group, W.J. Smith, having read about the English town of the same name. A postal receiving office was established at E.H. Biggs' Luton Vale Orchard in 1892.  The area was officially named Mapleton, as a postal site, in 1894.

During the 1890s, the area continued to develop with farm selections being made for various orchards and plantations.

Mapleton Provisional School opened on 17 July 1899  with an initial enrolment of 15 students under teacher Lizzie Fitzgerald. It became Mapleton State School on 1 January 1909.

In 1906, the road from the Mary Valley to Mapleton was complete.

By 1909, a sawmill was operating in the town. It closed in 1972.

The Mapleton Methodist Church was officially opened on Sunday 11 July 1909 by the Reverend W. Stanley Bath. The contractor was Mr W. Lanham. The church was located approximately at 21 Flaxton Drive. The church was still open in 1965, but, as at 2021, it is no longer operating and the building no longer exists.

It was worked by two shay locomotives.

Pineapples, dairying and small crops were the towns major industries until the late 1950s.

The scenic beauty of the area has allowed tourism to dominate in the decades since.

Heritage listings
Mapleton has a heritage-listed site:
 St Isidore's (also known as Seaview House), 40 Post Office Road

Education
Mapleton State School is a government primary (Prep-6) school for boys and girls at Flaxton Drive. In 2017, the school had an enrolment of 218 students with 21 teachers (14 full-time equivalent) and 14 non-teaching staff (8 full-time equivalent). It includes a special education program. The school grounds are large and include Baxters Creek and a new covered multi-purpose area, administration offices and resource centre which opened in December 2009.

There are no secondary schools in Mapleton. The nearest government secondary school is Burnside State High School in Burnside, Nambour, to the east.

Amenities 
The Mapleton Community Library is at 10 Obi Obi Creek Road.  It is operated by volunteers.

Mapleton Post Office is at 11 Post Office Road.

Mapleton has many other community services, associations and clubs including the Mapleton & District Community Associations (MADCA), a bowls club and community gym, a tourist information and arts centre, a choir, tennis club, kindergarten and rural fire service. There is also a medical centre which provides primary health care for the community. The Mapleton Tennis Club at 31 Obi Obi Road has two outdoor courts available to club members and the general public.

Attractions 
The Blackall Range Tourist Drive gives visitors access to shops on Obi Obi Road and Post Office Road in Mapleton. These shops include a fish and chip shop, cafe and delicatessen, bakery, two coffee shops, a tavern with bottle shop, a gallery, art & gift shop, leadlight workshop, and a pizza and pasta restaurant.

There is a Community Information Centre in Obi Obi Road. Next door, in the Old School House, is a secondhand clothing shop that raises money for the Sunshine Coast Community Hospice. Mapleton has a hardware, supermarket, service station, pharmacy, three real estate agents, and a number of massage services, alternative therapists, physiotherapist and hairdressers.

The largest attraction of visitors to the town is the Queensland Conference and Camping (QCCC) Outdoor Education Centre which was built in 1983.  The facility hosts 30,000 guests annually, most of them school children  The 55-acre property has more than twenty activity options and employs eighty local people.

The Mapleton Observatory is at the Mapleton State School. It is operated by volunteers and is open to the public.

Mapleton Falls National Park (formerly Mapleton Forest Reserve) protects rainforest remnants with bunya pines, piccabeen palm groves, tall open blackbutt forests and picturesque mountain scenery. Picnic tables, toilets and barbecues are provided.

The Park marks the point just west of Mapleton where Pencil Creek cascades 120 metres over an escarpment. This small, day-use-only park, shelters many bird species, including the peregrine falcon, eastern whipbird and wompoo fruit-dove. From the carpark there is a short walk to Mapleton Falls lookout with wheelchair access to toilet and lookout. The panoramic view takes in the waterfall and Obi Obi Valley. From the open, grassy picnic area, the Wompoo circuit winds through eucalypts and rainforest where visitors may hear the fruit-dove's booming calls, wallock-a-woo and book-a-roo. Near the causeway pool frogs may be heard and distinctive hexagonal volcanic rocks seen.

The Lilyponds area was for many years a swamp and underwent an $800,000 makeover to turn it into a community park. There are free BBQ's, children's play park and covered seating areas.

Delicia Road Conservation Park is a small park protecting remnant forest communities. It is a refuge for wildlife and a place where visitors can enjoy the native forest. The land was donated by Linda Garrett and so locals refer to it as Linda Garrett Park. There is a  walk called the Linda Garrett circuit which passes through rainforest, a palm grove and tall, wet, eucalypt forest. The great barred frog may be seen along Gheerulla Creek and birdwatchers may hear the melodic, drumming call of the endangered marbled frogmouth.

Accommodation
Mapleton has two caravan parks, several self-catering units, and bed-and-breakfasts accommodation.  Queensland Conference and Camping Centres Mapleton currently offers three hundred beds.

See also

 Mapleton Falls National Park
 Nexus (magazine), based in Mapleton.
 List of tramways in Queensland
 Blackall Range road network

References

Attribution 

 This article incorporates text from  Published under CC-BY-4.0 licence ("Using State Library website and blog content").

Further reading

External links

 
 Town map of Mapleton, 1974

Suburbs of the Sunshine Coast Region
Towns in Queensland
Localities in Queensland